Prime is a Moldovan generalist television channel. The channel is distributed via DVB-T2, by the cable and IPTV operators in Moldova and broadcasts through analogue terrestrial television at a national level.

The owner of the channel is Moldovan oligarch Vlad Plahotniuc. Since its inception, it was one of Moldova's most popular channels.

The channel was criticized and on 4 July 2014, the Coordinating Council of the Audiovisual of Moldova sanctioned Prime and other channels for broadcasting Russian "informative-analytical" programs, which contained aggressive propaganda and promotes and increases fake news and information regarding the Ukrainian government.

Original shows/programs

References

External links
official website

Television channels in Moldova
Television channels and stations established in 1999
1999 establishments in Moldova
Mass media in Chișinău